Haiti is a free market economy with low labor costs. A republic, it was a French colony before gaining independence in an uprising by its enslaved people. It faced embargoes and isolation after its independence as well as political crises punctuated by foreign interventions and devastating natural disasters. Haiti's estimated population in 2018 was 11,439,646. The Economist reported in 2010:
"Long known as the poorest country in the Western hemisphere, Haiti has stumbled from one crisis to another since the Duvalier (François Duvalier) years."

Haiti has an agricultural economy. Over half of the world's vetiver oil (an essential oil used in high-end perfumes) comes from Haiti. Bananas, cocoa, and mangoes are important export crops. Haiti has also moved to expand to higher-end manufacturing, producing Android-based tablets and current sensors and transformers. Its major trading partner is the United States (US), which provides the country with preferential trade access to the US market through the Haiti Hemispheric Opportunity through Partnership Encouragement (HOPE) and the Haiti Economic Lift Program Encouragement Acts (HELP) legislation.

Vulnerability to natural disasters, as well as poverty and limited access to education are among Haiti's most serious disadvantages. Two-fifths of all Haitians depend on the agriculture sector, mainly small-scale subsistence farming, and remain vulnerable to damage from frequent natural disasters, exacerbated by the country's widespread deforestation. Haiti suffers from a severe trade deficit, which it is working to address by moving into higher-end manufacturing and more value-added products in the agriculture sector. Remittances are the primary source of foreign exchange, equaling nearly 20% of GDP. Haiti's economy was severely impacted by the 2010 Haiti earthquake which occurred on 12 January 2010.

Economic history

Before the people enslaved in Haiti to work its  plantations revolted against French colonization in 1804, Haiti ranked as the world's richest and most productive colony. In the formative years of independence, Haiti suffered from isolation on the international stage, as evidenced by the early lack of diplomatic recognition accorded to it by Europe and the United States (which did not recognize it until 1862); this had a negative impact on investment in Haiti. Another economic obstacle in Haiti's early independence was its payment of 150 million francs to France beginning in 1825; this did much to drain the country of its capital stock. France forced Haiti to pay for its independence and freedom from colonization.
According to a 2014 study, the Haitian economy stagnated due to a combination of weak state power and adverse international relations. The authors write:
For the newborn 'Negro republic', it was hard to become recognised as a sovereign nation state, it was difficult to form strategic alliances, to get access to foreign loans, and to safeguard trade interests, and it was overloaded with debt under threat of external violence (the French indemnity). Self-chosen isolation, for instance by prohibiting foreign landownership, further reduced the choice set of successive Haitian administrations. When opportunities for export-led growth opened up in the late 19th century, the odds were stacked against Haiti.

The United States invaded and occupied Haiti from 1915 to 1934.

In the aftermath of the 1994 restoration of constitutional governance, Haitian officials have indicated their commitment to economic reform through the implementation of sound fiscal and monetary policies and the enactment of legislation mandating the modernization of state-owned enterprises. A council to guide the modernization program (CMEP) was established and a timetable was drawn up to modernize nine key parastatals. Although the state-owned flour-mill and cement plants have been transferred to private owners, progress on the other seven parastatals has stalled. The modernization of Haiti's state-enterprises remains a controversial political issue in Haiti.

Under President René Préval (1996–2001, 2006 – 14 May 2011), the country's economic agenda included trade and tariff liberalization, measures to control government expenditure and increase tax revenues, civil-service downsizing, financial-sector reform, the privatization of state-owned enterprises, and the provision of private sector management contracts, or joint public-private investment. Structural adjustment agreements with the International Monetary Fund, World Bank, Inter-American Development Bank, and other international financial institutions aiming at creating necessary conditions for private sector growth, have proved only partly successful.

Comparative social and economic indicators show Haiti falling behind other low-income developing countries (particularly in the Western hemisphere) since the 1980s. Haiti's economic stagnation results from earlier inappropriate economic policies, political instability, a shortage of good arable land, environmental deterioration, continued use of traditional technologies, under-capitalization and lack of public investment in human resources, migration of large portions of the skilled population, and a weak national savings rate.

Haiti continues to suffer the consequences of the 1991 coup. The irresponsible economic and financial policies of de facto authorities greatly accelerated Haiti's economic decline. Following the coup, the United States adopted mandatory sanctions, and the OAS instituted voluntary sanctions aimed at restoring constitutional government. International sanctions culminated in the May 1994 United Nations embargo of all goods entering Haiti except humanitarian supplies, such as food and medicine. The assembly sector, heavily dependent on U.S. markets for its products, employed nearly 80,000 workers in the mid-1980s. During the embargo, employment fell from 33,000 workers in 1991 to 400 in October 1995. Private, domestic and foreign investment has been slow to return to Haiti. Since the return of constitutional rule, assembly sector employment has gradually recovered with over 20,000 now employed, but further growth has been stalled by investor concerns over safety and supply reliability.

Remittances from abroad have consistently constituted a significant source of financial support for many Haitian households.

The Haitian Ministry of Economy and Finance designed the Haiti economic reforms of 1996 to rebuild the economy of Haiti after significant downturns suffered in the previous years. The primary reforms centered around the Emergency Economic Recovery Plan (EERP) and were followed by budget reforms.

Haiti's real GDP growth turned negative in FY 2001 after six years of growth. Real GDP fell by 1.1% in FY 2001 and 0.9% in FY 2002. Macroeconomic stability was adversely affected by political uncertainty, the collapse of informal banking cooperatives, high budget deficits, low investment, and reduced international capital flows, including suspension of IFI lending as Haiti fell into arrears with the Inter-American Development Bank (IDB) and World Bank.

Haiti's economy stabilized in 2003. Although FY 2003 began with the rapid decline of the gourde due to rumors that U.S. dollar deposit accounts would be nationalized and due to the withdrawal of fuel subsidies, the government successfully stabilized the gourde as it took the politically difficult decisions to float fuel prices freely according to world market prices and to raise interest rates. Government agreement with the International Monetary Fund (IMF) on a staff monitored program (SMP), followed by its payment of its $32 million arrears to the IDB in July, paved the way for renewed IDB lending. The IDB disbursed $35 million of a $50 million policy-based loan in July and began disbursing four previously approved project loans totaling $146 million. The IDB, IMF, and World Bank also discussed new lending with the government. Much of this would be contingent on government adherence to fiscal and monetary targets and policy reforms, such as those begun under the SMP, and Haiti's payment of its World Bank arrears ($30 million at 9/30/03).

The IMF estimated that real GDP was flat in FY 2003 and projected 1% real GDP growth for FY 2004. However, GDP per capita – amounting to $425 in FY 2002 – will continue to decline as population growth is estimated at 1.3% p.a. While implementation of governance reforms and peaceful resolution of the political stalemate are key to long-term growth, external support remains critical in avoiding economic collapse. The major element is foreign remittances, reported as $931 million in 2002, primarily from the U.S. Foreign assistance, meanwhile, was $130 million in FY 2002. Overall foreign assistance levels have declined since FY 1995, the year elected government was restored to power under a United Nations mandate, when the international community provided over $600 million in aid.

A legal minimum wage of 36 gourdes a day (about U.S. $1.80) was set in 1995, and applies to most workers in the formal sector. It was later raised to 70 gourdes per day. This minimum is 200 gourdes a day (about U.S. $4.80). 39.175 gourds= a U.S dollar.

Haiti's economy suffered a severe setback in January 2010 when a 7.0 magnitude earthquake destroyed much of its capital city, Port-au-Prince, and neighboring areas. Already the poorest country in the Americas with 80% of the population living under the poverty line and 54% in abject poverty, the earthquake inflicted $7.8 billion in damage and caused the country's GDP to contract 5.4% in 2010. Following the earthquake, Haiti received $4.59 billion in international pledges for reconstruction, which has proceeded slowly.

US economic engagement under the Haitian Hemispheric Opportunity through Partnership Encouragement (HOPE) Act, passed in December 2006, has boosted apparel exports and investment by providing duty-free access to the US. Congress voted in 2010 to extend the legislation until 2020 under the HELP Act; the apparel sector accounts for about 90% of Haitian exports and nearly one-tenth of GDP. Remittances are the primary source of foreign exchange, equaling nearly 20% of GDP and more than twice the earnings from exports. Haiti suffers from a lack of investment, partly because of limited infrastructure and a lack of security. In 2005, Haiti paid its arrears to the World Bank, paving the way for reengagement with the Bank. Haiti received debt forgiveness for over $1 billion through the Highly-Indebted Poor Country initiative in mid-2009. The remainder of its outstanding external debt was cancelled by donor countries following the 2010 earthquake but has since risen to over $600 million. The government relies on formal international economic assistance for fiscal sustainability, with over half of its annual budget coming from outside sources. The Michel Martelly administration in 2011 launched a campaign aimed at drawing foreign investment into Haiti as a means for sustainable development.

Debt cancellation
In 2005 Haiti's total external debt reached an estimated US$1.3 billion, which corresponds to debt per capita of US$169, in contrast to the debt per capita of the United States which is US$40,000. Following the democratic election of Aristide in December 1990, many international creditors responded by cancelling significant amounts of Haiti's debt, bringing the total down to US$777 million in 1991. However, new borrowing during the 1990s swelled the debt to more than US$1 billion.

At peak, Haiti's total external debt was estimated at 1.8 billion dollars, including half a billion dollars to the Inter-American Development Bank, Haiti's largest creditor. In September 2009, Haiti met the conditions set out by the IMF and World Bank's Heavily Indebted Poor Countries program, qualifying it for cancellation of some of its external debt. This amounted to a cancellation of $1.2 billion. Despite this as of 2010 calls for cancellation of its remaining $1 billion debts came strongly from civil society groups such as the Jubilee Debt Campaign in reaction to the effects of the earthquake that hit the country.

Primary industries

Primary industries are crucial to maintaining Haiti's economic diversity and relevance internationally.

Agriculture, forestry, and fishing

Although many Haitians make their living through subsistence farming, Haiti also has an agricultural export sector. Agriculture, together with forestry and fishing, accounts for about one-quarter (28% in 2004) of Haiti's annual gross domestic product and employs about two-thirds (66% in 2004) of the labor force. However, expansion has been difficult because mountains cover much of the countryside and limit the land available for cultivation. Of the total arable land of 550,000 hectares, 125,000 hectares are suited for irrigation, and of those only 75,000 hectares actually have been improved with irrigation. Haiti's dominant cash crops include coffee, mangoes, and cocoa. Haiti has decreased its production of sugarcane, traditionally an important cash crop, because of declining prices and fierce international competition. Because Haiti's forests have thinned dramatically, timber exports have declined. Roundwood removals annually total about 1,000 kilograms. Haiti also has a small fishing industry. Annual catches in recent years have totaled about 5,000 tons.

Mining and minerals 
Haiti has a mining industry which extracted minerals worth approximately US$13 million in 2013. Bauxite, copper, calcium carbonate, gold, and marble were the most extensively extracted minerals in Haiti. Lime and aggregates and to a lesser extent marble are extracted. Gold was mined by the Spanish in early colonial times. Bauxite was mined for a number of years in recent times at a site near Miragoâne on the Southern peninsula. Operating from 1960 to 1972 International Halliwell Mines, Ltd. ("Halliwell"), a Canadian corporation, through its wholly owned Haitian subsidiary, La Societe d'Exploitation et de Developpement Economique et Natural d'Haiti ("Sedren") mined copper near Gonaïves.

0.5 million tons of ore were exported. The copper ore was valued at about $83.5 million. The government of Haiti received about $3 million. As of 2012 there was promise of gold and copper mining in northern Haiti.

Gold
Estimates for the value of the gold which might be extracted through open-pit mining are as high as US$20 billion. Eurasian Minerals and Newmont Mining Corporation are two of the firms involved. According to Alex Dupuy, Chair of African American Studies and John E. Andrus Professor of Sociology at Wesleyan University the ability of Haiti to adequately manage the mining operations or to obtain and use funds obtained from the operations for the benefit of its people is untested and seriously questioned. Lakwèv, where earth dug from hand-made tunnels is washed for specks of free gold by local residents, is one of the locations. In the same mineralized zone in the Dominican Republic Barrick Gold and Goldcorp are planning on reopening the Pueblo Viejo mine.

Secondary industries
Secondary industries in Haiti are beset by a variety of problems, while having some austerity measures to counteract them.

Manufacturing
The leading industries in Haiti produce beverages, butter, cement, detergent, edible oils, flour, refined sugar, soap, and textiles. Growth in both manufacturing and industry as a whole has been slowed by a lack of capital investment. Grants from the United States and other countries have targeted this problem, but without much success. Private home building and construction appear to be one subsector with positive prospects for growth.

In 2004 industry accounted for about 20 percent of the gross domestic product (GDP), and less than 10 percent of the labor force worked in industrial production. As a portion of the GDP, the manufacturing sector has contracted since the 1980s. The United Nations embargo of 1994 put out of work most of the 80,000 workers in the assembly sector. Additionally, the years of military rule following the presidential coup in 1991 resulted in the closure of most of Haiti's offshore assembly plants in the free zones surrounding Port-au-Prince. When President Aristide returned to Haiti, some improvements did occur in the manufacturing sector.

Haiti's cheaper labor brought some textile and garment assembly work back to the island in the late 1990s. Although these gains were undercut by international competition, the apparel sector in 2008 made up two-thirds of Haiti's annual 490 million US dollars exports. USA economic engagement under the HOPE Act, from December 2006, increased apparel exports and investment by providing tariff-free access to the USA. HOPE II, in October 2008, further improved the situation by extending preferences to 2018.

Energy

Haiti uses very little energy, the equivalent of approximately 250 kilograms of oil per head per year. In 2003, Haiti produced 546 million kilowatt-hours of electricity while consuming 508 million kilowatt-hours. In 2013, it stood 135th out of 135 countries in net total consumption of electricity.

Most of the country's energy comes from the burning of wood. The Péligre Dam, the country's largest, provides the capital city of Port-au-Prince with energy. Thermal plants provide electricity to the rest of the country. Even with the country's low level of demand for energy, the supply of electricity traditionally has been sporadic and prone to shortages. Mismanagement by the state has offset more than US$100 million in foreign investment targeted at improving Haiti's energy infrastructure. Businesses have resorted to securing back-up power sources to deal with the regular outages. The potential for greater hydropower exists, should Haiti have the desire and means to develop it. The government controls oil and gas prices, to an extent insulating Haitians from international price fluctuations.

Tertiary industries
Haiti relies significantly on tertiary industries for its economy.

Services
Haiti's services sector made up 52 percent of the country's gross domestic product in 2004 and employed 25 percent of the labor force. According to World Bank statistics, the services sector is one of the few sectors of Haiti's economy that sustained steady, if modest, growth throughout the 1990s.

Banking
Lack of a stable and trustworthy banking system has impeded Haiti's economic development. Banks in Haiti have collapsed on a regular basis. Most Haitians do not have access to loans of any sort. When reelected in 2000, President Aristide promised to remedy this situation but instead introduced a non-sustainable plan of "cooperatives" that guaranteed investors a 10 percent rate of return. By 2000, the cooperatives had crumbled and Haitians had collectively lost more than US$200 million in savings.

Haiti's central bank, the Bank of the Republic of Haiti, oversees 10 commercial banks and two foreign banks operating in the country. Most banking takes place in the capital city of Port-au-Prince. The United Nations and the International Monetary Fund have led efforts to diversify and expand the finance sector, making credit more available to rural populations. In 2002, the Canadian International Development Agency led a training program for Haitian Credit Unions. Haiti has no stock exchange.

Tourism

Tourism in Haiti has suffered from the country's political upheaval. Inadequate infrastructure also has limited visitors to the island. In the 1970s and 1980s, however, tourism was an important industry, drawing an average of 150,000 visitors annually. Since the 1991 coup, tourism has recovered slowly. The Caribbean Tourism Organization (CTO) has joined the Haitian government in an effort to restore the island's image as a tourist destination. In 2001, 141,000 foreigners visited Haiti. Most came from the United States. To make tourism a major industry for Haiti, further improvements in hotels, restaurants and other infrastructure still are needed.

Television 
International television companies have earned subscriber bases in the tens of thousands, and Canal+ sees significant room to develop the pay TV industry in Haiti, having earned over 100,000 subscribers in the country as of 2021.

Macro-Economic 
The following table shows the main economic indicators in 1980–2017.

See also
 List of Haitian companies
 List of Latin American and Caribbean countries by GDP (nominal)
 List of Latin American and Caribbean countries by GDP (PPP)

Footnotes

References
Much of this article is based on public domain material from the U.S. government. See:
US Dept of State

CIA World Factbook: Haiti
Haiti Agriculture
Inter-American Bank Grant To Benefit Haitian Coffee Growers
Haitian Free Trade Zone
IICA plants for Haiti's environment
Defending Labor Rights in Haiti
CTH Secretary General Paul Chery interviewed on the 2004 coup and labor issues
HAITI: Pain at the Pump Spurs Strike Actions
HAITI: Workers Protest Privatisation Layoffs

External links and further reading
'Haiti’s Grim History of Being "Open for Business"'
"CHRONOLOGIE DU SECTEUR MINIER HAITIEN (de 1492 à 2000")
Google translation of "CHRONOLOGY OF MINING HAITIAN (From 1492 to 2000)"

 
Economics in developing countries
Haiti